Coup de Grâce is a 1969 Argentine film directed by Ricardo Becher. It was entered into the 19th Berlin International Film Festival.

Cast
 Sergio Mulet - Daniel
 Franca Tosato - Josefina
 Roberto Plate - Raul
 Mario Skubin - Mario
 Alejandro Holst - Quique
 María Vargas - La Negra
 Bocha Mantiniani - Carlos
 Alfredo Plank - Plank
 Juan Carlos Gené - Ramon
 Cristina Plate - Greta
 Edgardo Suárez - Paco

References

External links

1969 films
1960s Spanish-language films
1969 comedy films
Films directed by Ricardo Becher
Argentine comedy films
1960s Argentine films